Taunga Toka is a Cook Islands politician and former member of the Cook Islands Parliament.  He is a member of the Cook Islands Democratic Party.

Toka was elected to the seat of Rakahanga in the 2010 election.  His election was challenged by an electoral petition alleging that some voters were ineligible to vote, but this was unsuccessful. He was not re-elected at the 2014 election, losing to the Cook Islands Party's Toka Hagai.

References

Living people
Members of the Parliament of the Cook Islands
Democratic Party (Cook Islands) politicians
People from Rakahanga
Year of birth missing (living people)